Cameron Scott (born 7 October 1999) is a professional rugby league footballer who plays as a er for Hull F.C. in the Super League.

Scott has spent time on loan from Hull at Doncaster in Betfred League 1, and the Dewsbury Rams, York City Knights and the Leigh Centurions in the Betfred Championship.

Background
Scott was born in Bradford, West Yorkshire, England. He started his junior career at Wyke arlfc.

Career
In 2018, he made his Super League début for Hull F.C. against Hull Kingston Rovers.

References

External links
Hull FC profile
SL profile

1999 births
Living people
Dewsbury Rams players
Doncaster R.L.F.C. players
Hull F.C. players
Leigh Leopards players
Rugby league centres
Rugby league players from Bradford
York City Knights players